Indori fort also known as Induri Fort is one of the many Land forts of Maharashtra state in India. The fort is located on the banks of Indrayani river. The fort was under the Maratha empire for the majority of the time.

History
Indori fort was built by Sarsenapati Khandojirao Yesajirao Dabhade in the year 1720-21. The fort also has a mint building inside the fort which is in a dilapidated state. The widow of Khanderao (Khandojirao), Sarsenapati Umabai Dabhade, was the first and only woman to become Commander-in-Chief of the Maratha forces in 1732. Their daughter Savitribai Dabhade married Srimant Yeshwantrao Mande (Sardar or equivalent of Earl), a descendent of Moropant Trimbak Pingle, the first Peshwa of the Maratha Empire, serving on Shivaji Maharaj's Ashta Pradhan (Council of Eight Ministers). 

Induri Fort is also famous as the 'Sarsenapati Dabhade Gaadi' (seat of power) at Induri in 1720–21. The Samadhi of Sarsenapati Khanderao Dabhade is situated at the Shrimant Sarsenapati Dabhade Baneshwar Mandir in Talegaon Dabhade. The current Srimant is Abhishek Mande Bhot, who ascended upon the 'Gaadi' in 1990 upon turning 15.

Accessibility
Indori fort can be accessed by various modes of travel. The nearest railway station is the Ghorawadi 4 KM and Talegaon Dabhade railway station which is 4.8 KM from Indori Fort are easily accessed by suburban trains between Lonavala and Pune. The nearest major train station is Lonavala, on the Mumbai-Pune railway line. Indori is connected by the Mumbai-Pune Highway and can also be accessed from Talegaon Dabhade (PIN -410506) town.

Places to see
The fort is close to the village Indori. The entrance gate is in good condition. The fort has 9 bastions which are well connected by fortification wall. The walls of the fort are 30-40 feet high made of basalt rock with brick work at the top. There is a temple of Kadjai inside the fort.

Gallery

See also
List of forts in Maharashtra

References

External links

Buildings and structures of the Maratha Empire
Lonavala-Khandala
Forts in Pune district
Buildings and structures in Lonavala-Khandala
Holkar
Indore